Turki is a given name and surname, for more etymology, see Turki (disambiguation).

Given name
 Turki ibn Abdallah, founder of the Second Saudi State
 Turki al-Hamad, Saudi Arabian political analyst
 Turki Al-Maliki, Saudi Arabian colonel
 Turki Faisal Al Rasheed, Saudi Arabian businessman
 Turki bin Said, Sultan of Oman
 Turki bin Abdulaziz Al Saud, Saudi royal
 Turki bin Abdulaziz Al Saud, Saudi Arabian royal
 Turki bin Abdullah Al Saud, Saudi Arabian politician
Turki bin Bandar Al Saud, Saudi Arabian military officer
 Turki bin Faisal Al Saud, Saudi Arabian politician
 Turki bin Mohammed Al Saud (born 1979), Saudi Arabian politician
 Turki bin Muqrin bin Abdulaziz, Saudi Arabian businessman
 Turki bin Nasser Al Saud, Saudi Arabian military officer and businessman
 Turki bin Salman Al Saud, Saudi Arabian businessman
 Turki bin Sultan Al Saud, Saudi royal
 Turki bin Talal Al Saud, Saudi Arabian politician

Surname
 Abdel Basset Turki, Iraqi politician
 Daud Turki, Palestinian poet
 Pandit Taba Ram Turki, Urdu and Persian poet from India
 Rachid Turki, Tunisian football manager
 Yahia Turki, Tunisian painter

References

Arabic-language surnames
Arabic masculine given names